Darby the Dragon is a children's video game developed by Capitol Multimedia and published by Broderbund in 1996 for Macintosh and Microsoft Windows.

Summary
This game follows two young dragons, Darby and his sister Sparkle (who has been shrunk), on a quest to find the ingredients of a potion that will "make Sparkle big again". This game is full of puzzles and allows children to solve problems in order to complete tasks. There are songs throughout the game that are both key to some of the puzzles, such as clues, and some are just for fun.

Voices
Darby - Chloe Leamon
Sparkle - Wendy Sakakeeny
King - 
Queen - 
Solwyn - 
Maggie - 
Amanda - 
The Mask Maker - 
Guard - 
Dag - 
Jethro - 
The Mountain Troll - 
The Swamp Troll - 
Jeremy - 
Court Jester - 
The Unicorn - 
Jack Rabbit - 
The Vultures - 
The Swamp Frog -

Uncategorized: Antoinette Heery, Chloe Leamon, Jack Blovits, Jerry Kissel, Laura Siersema, Mike McNally, Wendy Sakakeeny, Will Le Bow, and Wren Ross.

Reception

References

External links

Darby the Dragon review (at Internet Archive)

1996 video games
Broderbund games
Adventure games
Classic Mac OS games
ScummVM-supported games
Video games developed in the United States
Windows games
Children's educational video games
Video games about dragons